Waterfront (known as Waterfront–SEU from 1997 to 2011) is a Washington Metro station in the Southwest Waterfront neighborhood of Washington, D.C., United States. The station was opened on December 28, 1991, and is operated by the Washington Metropolitan Area Transit Authority (WMATA). Waterfront is located in the Southwest Waterfront neighborhood at the intersection of 4th and M Streets SW.

Notable places nearby 
 Arena Stage
 Fort Lesley McNair
 Titanic Memorial
 The Wharf

History
Much of the physical construction of the station was complete by 1980, and its opening was initially to occur in 1983. However, due to litigation surrounding where the line would terminate in Prince George's County, planning and construction of the Green Line halted in 1981 and would not resume until 1985.

Name changes
The station was renamed Waterfront–SEU in 1997, referring to the nearby Southeastern University.  Southeastern University closed in 2009, and the station reverted to the Waterfront name on November 3, 2011.

Station layout
The station has an island platform with a single escalator bank entrance north of the intersection of 4th and M Streets.

References

External links
 

 The Schumin Web Transit Center: Waterfront Station
 4th Street entrance from Google Maps Street View

Stations on the Green Line (Washington Metro)
Washington Metro stations in Washington, D.C.
Railway stations in the United States opened in 1991
1991 establishments in Washington, D.C.
Railway stations located underground in Washington, D.C.
Southwest Waterfront